Awa Maru may refer to the following ships:

 , an NYK Lines passenger and cargo vessel launched in 1899; taken out of commercial service in 1930
 , an NYK Lines passenger and cargo vessel launched in 1942; torpedoed and sunk in 1945 during World War II
 , a Japanese cargo ship torpedoed and sunk on 13 May 1944

Ship names

ja:阿波丸